Sylhet City Corporation that governs the Sylhet city in Bangladesh is divided into wards. As of 2022 it has 39 wards and together with 207 mahallahs (areas). The city was changed from a municipal board to a city corporation in 2001.

Ward 1
Councillor: Syed Tawfiqul Hadi 

 Ambarkhana
 Dargah Mahalla
 Darshan Deury
 Dargah Gate
 Jhornar Par
 Mirer Maydan
 Mian Fazil Chist
 Purba Subidbazar
 Rajargali

Ward 2
Councillor: Mr. Bikram Kor Shomrat
   
 Dariapara
 Jallar Par
 Kethripara
 Kazi Elias
 Lama Bazar (Saraspur)
 Mirza Jangal
 Zindabazar

Ward 3
Councillor: A.K.A Layek

 Kajal Shah
 Keyapara
 Munshipara
 Subid Bazar
 M.A.G Osmani Medical 
 Police Line

Ward 4
Councillor: Rezaul Hasan Ludhi (Qais Ludhi)
  
 Ambarkhana
 Dattapara
 Housing Estate
 Lichu Bagan
 Mazumdari

Ward 5
Councillor: Razwan Ahmed
  
 Borobazar
 Electric Supply
 Goypara (Chachnipara)
 khasdobir
 Eidgah 
 Hazaribag
T.B colony

Ward 6
Councillor: Farhad Chowdhury Shamim

 Badam Bagicha
 Choukidighi
 Eliaskandi
 Syedmogni

Ward 7
Councillor: Aftab Hussain Khan

 Jalalabad
 West Pir Moholla
 Soyef Khan Road
 Subid Bazar
 Uttar Pir Moholla (Paharika)
 Haji Para
 Bon kolapara
 Fazil Chishti
 Kolapara
 Mitali
 Londoni Road

Ward 8
Councilor: Muhammad Ilyasur Rahman

 Brahman Shashan(ব্রাহ্মণশাসন)
 Hauldar Para (হাওলাদার পাড়া)
 Kucharpara
 Korarpara(করেরপাড়া)
 Noapara
 Ponitula (পনিটুলা) 
 Pathantula(পাঠানটুলা)

Ward 9
Councilor: Haji Muhammad Muqlisur Rahman Kamran

 Akhalia
 Baghbari
 Dhanuhata
 Kuliapara
 Madina Market
 Nehari Para
 Pathantula
 Sagardigir Par

Ward 10
Councillor: Salih Ahmad Chowdhury

  Lamapara
  
 Shamimabad
 Kanishail 
 Kalapara

 Majumder Para
 Molla Para
 Nabab Road
 Wapda

Ward 11
Councillor: Raqibul Islam Zholok
 Rohon Das Ratul
 Bhatalia
 Bil Par
 Kajalshah
 Kuarpar
 Lala Dighirpar
 Madhu Shahid
 Noapara
 Rekabi Baza

Ward 12
Councillor: Muhammad Sikandar Ali

 Bhangatikar
 Itakhola
 Kuarpar
 Saudagartala
 Sheikhghat

Ward 13
Councillor: Shantonu Datta (Santu)
  
 taltola south
 Itakhola
 Saudagartala
 tufkhana
 masudhighir par
 mirja jungle
 Jitu miar point 
 Ramer Dighir Par
 Sheikh para
 Lamabazar 
 Monipuri rajbari

Ward 14
Councillor: Nazrul Islam Munim

 Bandar Bazar
 Brahmandi Bazar
 Chali Bandar Poschim, Chararpar
 Hasan Market
 Dak Bangla Road
 Dhupra Dighirpar
 Jallar Par
 Jamtala
 Houkers Market
 Kastagarh
 Kamal Garh
 Kalighat
 Lal Dighirpar
 Paura Biponi
 Paura Mirzajangal
 Shah Chatt Road
 Uttar Taltola
 Zinda Bazar

Ward 15
Councillor: Saifur Amin (Baker)

 Bandar Bazar
 Baruth Khana
 Chali Bandar
 Churi Patti
 Hasan Market
 Jail Road
 Joynagar
 Jatarpur
 Nayarpool
 Noapara
 Suphani Ghat
 Puran Lane
 Uttar Dhopa Dighirpar
 Zinda Bazar

Ward 16
Councillor: Abdul Muhit Javed

 Charadigirpar
 Dhoper Digirpar
 Hauapara
 Kahan Daura
 Kumarpara
 Purba Zinda Bazar
 Naya Sarak
 Saodagor Tola
 Tantipara

Ward 17
Councillor:  Rashed Ahmed

 Kazitula
 Electric Supply
 Ambarkhana
 Mirboxtula
 Chondontula
 Chowhatta
 Uchashorok
 Kumarpara
 Shahi Eidgah
 Noyashorok
 Loharpara

Ward 18
Councillor:  A.B.M. Zillur Rahman

 Brajahat Tila
 Evergreen
 Jhornar Par
 Jherbn jheri Para
 Kumar Para
 Mira Bazar
 Mousumi
 Sabuj Bagh
 Serak
 Shahi Eidgah
 Shakhari Para

Ward 19
Councillor:  S.M Shawkat Amin Tawhid

 Chandani Tila
 Shahi Eidgah
 TB Gate
 Daptari Para
 Darjee Band
 Darjee Para
 Goner Para
 Kahar Para
 Raynagar
 Sonapara

Ward 20
Councillor:  Somsuddin hashir vila

 Balichhara South
 Kharadi Para
 Lama Para
 Majumder Para
 Roynagar
 Senpara
 Sonarpara
 Shibganj
 Shadipur
 Tilaghor
 Gopaltila
 Vatatikor

Ward 21
Councillor: Muhammad Abdur Raqib Tuhin

 Bhatatikr
 Brahman Para
 Gopal Tila
 Hatimbagh
 Lakri Para
 Sadipur
 Shaplabagh
 Tilaghar
 Rajpara
 Sonar Para

Ward 22
Councillor: Mr. Saleh Ahmed Selim

Shahjalal Uposhahar
 Uposhohor Block A-J
 Shahjalal Uposhohor Bangladesh Bank Colony

Ward 23
Councillor: Mostak Ahmed

 Machimpur
 Mehendibagh

Ward 24
Councillor: Suhayl Ahmad Ripon

 Hatimbagh
 Kushighat
 Lamapara
 Mirapara
 Sadatikar
 Saderpara
 Shapla Bagh
 Sadipur-2
 Tero Ratan
 Tultikar                     
 Purbo Sadatikar
 Sobujbag

Ward 25
Councillor: Takbir Islam Pinto

 Barokhola
 Godrail
 Khojarkhola
 Mominkhola
 Musargoan
 Lawai

Ward 26
Councillor: Muhammad Tawfiq Bakhsh

 Bharthokhola                      
 Chandnighat  
 Jalopara
 Kadamtali

Ward 27
Councilor: Azom Khan
 Alampur
 Ganganagar
 Mejortila

Dakshin kushighat

place map

https://goo.gl/maps/1AXso3mekH82

Sylhet
Sylhet District
Sylhet Division

References

External links
Sylhet City Corporation

Sylhet